Rebel FM (callsign: 4RBL) is an Active rock-formatted radio station, based in the Gold Coast suburb of Helensvale, Queensland, and broadcasting across regional and rural areas of Queensland and New South Wales. First broadcast as SUN FM in 1996, it is owned and operated by Rebel Media, which also operates The Breeze.

Frequencies

New South Wales
 93.7 FM Tenterfield

Queensland
 95.9 FM Alpha
 104.5 FM Aurukun
 88.9 FM Biloela
 93.7 FM Canungra
 104.9 FM Century Mine
 97.1 FM Chinchilla
 94.9 FM Collinsville
 99.3 FM Cooktown
 98.1 FM Dirranbandi
 99.4 FM Gold Coast
 96.3 FM Goondiwindi
 90.5 FM Logan & Beaudesert
 104.5 FM Hopevale
 99.5 FM Julia Creek
 98.1 FM Karumba
 102.5 FM Kooralbyn
 102.9 FM Kowanyama
 94.5 FM Miles
 105.1 FM Monto
 104.5 FM Mornington Island
 88.9 FM Moura
 101.7 FM Normanton
 101.7 FM Pormpuraaw
 99.7 FM Richmond
 97.1 FM Stanthorpe
 92.5 FM Taroom
 94.7 FM Theodore
 96.1 FM Weipa
 106.7 FM Wide Bay (Bundaberg / Maryborough)

References

External links

Active rock radio stations in Australia
Radio stations established in 1996
Radio stations on the Gold Coast, Queensland
Radio stations in Queensland
Radio stations in New South Wales